The 2022–23 Moldovan Youth League is the Moldovan annual football tournament. The competition started on 3 September 2022 and will conclude in May 2023.

Stadia and locations

Squads
Players must be born on or after 1 January 2004, with a maximum of five players born between 1 January 2003 and 31 December 2003 allowed in the squad, and a maximum of three of these players allowed per each match.

League table

Results 
Matches 1−18

Matches 19−27

References

2022–23 in Moldovan football